Janusz Kazimierz Gortat (born November 5, 1948) is a retired boxer from Poland, who represented his native country at two consecutive Summer Olympics, starting in 1972. In both tournaments he won the bronze medal in the light heavyweight division (– 75 kg) after being defeated in the semifinals by eventual winners (Leon Spinks of the United States in 1976 and Mate Parlov of Yugoslavia in 1972).

Born in Brzozów, he is the father of NBA basketball player Marcin Gortat and boxer Robert Gortat.

1972 Olympic results
Round of 32: Defeated Jaroslav Král (Czechoslovakia) by decision, 5–0
Round of 16: Defeated Raymond Russell (United States) by decision, 3–2
Quarterfinal: Defeated Rudi Hornig (West Germany) KO 1
Semifinal: Lost to Mate Parlov (Yugoslavia) by decision, 0–5

1976 Olympic results
Round of 32: Defeated Miloslav Popović (Yugoslavia) on points, 3–2
Round of 16 Defeated Georgi Stoymenov (Bulgaria) TKO 3
Quarterfinal: Defeated Juan Domingo Suarez (Argentina) on points, 4–1
Semifinal: Lost to Leon Spinks (United States) on points, 0–5

References
 databaseOlympics
 Janusz Gortat profile at the official website of the Polish Olympic Committee

1948 births
Living people
People from Tomaszów Mazowiecki County
Light-heavyweight boxers
Boxers at the 1972 Summer Olympics
Boxers at the 1976 Summer Olympics
Olympic boxers of Poland
Olympic bronze medalists for Poland
Olympic medalists in boxing
Sportspeople from Łódź Voivodeship
Polish male boxers
Medalists at the 1976 Summer Olympics
Medalists at the 1972 Summer Olympics